The 2022–23 Odense Boldklub season will be the club's 134th season, and their 61st appearance in the Danish Superliga.

First team

Last updated on 31 January 2023

Transfers

Transfers in

Loans in

Transfers out

Loans out

Friendlies

Pre-season

Winter season

Competitions

Superliga

League table

Results summary

Results by round

Matches

Squad statistics

Goalscorers
Includes all competitive matches. The list is sorted by shirt number when total goals are equal.

Disciplinary record

References

Odense Boldklub
Odense Boldklub seasons